Zakaria Gueye (born 22 February 1986 in Senegal) is a Senegalese former professional footballer who played as a midfielder.

Gueye previously played for CMS Oissel, Pacy Vallée-d'Eure Football, Belgian Pro League club SV Zulte Waregem, and Fréjus Saint-Raphaël.

References

1986 births
Living people
Senegalese footballers
Association football midfielders
Championnat National players
Belgian Pro League players
CMS Oissel players
Pacy Ménilles RC players
S.V. Zulte Waregem players
ÉFC Fréjus Saint-Raphaël players
US Quevilly-Rouen Métropole players
Senegalese expatriate footballers
Senegalese expatriate sportspeople in France
Expatriate footballers in France
Senegalese expatriate sportspeople in Belgium
Expatriate footballers in Belgium